Moodna may refer to:

 Moodna (moth), a genus of moth
Moodna Creek, a tributary of the Hudson River in New York State
Moodna Viaduct, spans the above creek
, at one time known as Moodna